Klaus Groh (born 30 August 1954) is a German weightlifter. He competed in the men's middleweight event at the 1976 Summer Olympics.

References

External links
 

1954 births
Living people
German male weightlifters
Olympic weightlifters of West Germany
Weightlifters at the 1976 Summer Olympics
People from Pirmasens
Sportspeople from Rhineland-Palatinate
20th-century German people